Mars Hill may refer to:

Places
 The Areopagus, in classical Athens, the first Mars Hill

United States
 Mars Hill, Alabama
 Mars Hill, Georgia
 Mars Hill (Iowa), a log church in Wapello County, Iowa; listed on the National Register of Historic Places
 Mars Hill, Maine, a New England town
 Mars Hill (CDP), Maine, the primary settlement in the town
 Mars Hill (Maine), prominent hill in the town
 Mars Hill, North Carolina
 Mars Hill, site of Lowell Observatory, Flagstaff, Arizona
 Mars Hill, neighborhood in Indianapolis, Indiana

Organizations
 Mars' Hill, the student newspaper of Trinity Western University
 Mars Hill Academy (Mason, OH), a school in Mason, Ohio
 Mars Hill Audio, a Christian publisher of audio materials, including a bimonthly journal
 Mars Hill Bible Church, a large church in Grandville, Michigan, once pastored by Rob Bell
 Mars Hill Bible School, a primary and secondary school in Florence, Alabama
 Mars Hill Church, a former large church in Seattle, Washington, pastored by Mark Driscoll
 Mars Hill Graduate School, a Christian graduate school in Seattle, Washington
 Mars Hill Network, a Christian radio network in New York
 Mars Hill University, formerly Mars Hill College, a four-year university in Mars Hill, North Carolina

See also
 Mars (disambiguation)
 Mars Hill Crossroads (disambiguation)